Offoy may refer to the following places in France:

 Offoy, Oise, a commune in the Oise department
 Offoy, Somme, a commune in the Somme department